Rezgar Amani (born June 1, 1992) is an Iranian-Finnish footballer who plays for Åland in the Kolmonen.

Career statistics

References

External links 

1992 births
Living people
People from Tehran
Finnish footballers
Iranian footballers
Iranian expatriate footballers
Finnish people of Iranian descent
Sportspeople of Iranian descent
IFK Mariehamn players
Ekenäs IF players
FC Åland players
Veikkausliiga players
Kakkonen players
Association football forwards